Michael Hans Lippert (24 April 1897 – 1 September 1969) was a mid-level commander in the Waffen-SS of Nazi Germany during World War II. He  commanded several concentration camps, including Sachsenhausen, before becoming a commander of the  SS-Freiwilligen Legion Flandern and the SS Division Frundsberg. He is known for co-murdering SA leader Ernst Röhm on 1 July 1934. In 1957, he was sentenced to 18 months in prison by a West German court for his part in Röhm's murder.

Career in the SS

Lippert joined the Nazi Party (number - 246,989) In June 1930 and the SS (number - 2,968) in March 1931. He became the adjutant for Theodor Eicke, who was appointed the commandant of Dachau concentration camp in 1933.

Execution of Ernst Röhm

In early 1934, Hitler and other Nazi leaders became concerned that Ernst Röhm, chief of the SA, was planning a coup d'état. Hitler decided on 21 June that Röhm and the SA leadership had to be eliminated. The purge of the SA leadership and other enemies of the state began on 30 June in an action which became known as the Night of the Long Knives. Eicke, along with hand-chosen members of the SS and Gestapo, assisted Sepp Dietrich's Leibstandarte SS Adolf Hitler in the arrest and imprisonment of SA commanders, before they were shot. After Röhm was arrested, Hitler gave the order that the imprisoned Röhm was to be executed. Himmler communicated Hitler's order to Eicke. Eicke was told to first give Röhm the choice to commit suicide. Accompanied by Lippert, and SS-Gruppenführer Ernst-Heinrich Schmauser, Eicke travelled to Stadelheim Prison in Munich where Röhm was being held.

After telling Röhm that he had forfeited his life and that Hitler had given him a last chance to avoid the consequences, Eicke laid a pistol on a table in Röhm's cell and told him that he had 10 minutes in which to use the weapon to kill himself. Eicke, Lippert and Schmauser left and waited in the corridor for 15 minutes, during which time no shot was heard. Finally, Eicke and Lippert drew their pistols and re-entered Röhm's cell. Both fired and Röhm fell to the floor. One of the two then crossed to Röhm and administered a coup-de-grace.

Military commands
Lippert became the first commanding officer of the Flemish Legion and commanded the unit in heavy fighting around the besieged city of Leningrad. His attitude towards his soldiers was "high-handed and disdainful" and he considered the Flemish to be "second-class soldiers". He was relieved of his command after being severely wounded in fighting in April 1942.

Postwar criminal conviction
In 1956, the Munich authorities began an investigation into the Night of the Long Knives and in August arrested Lippert and Sepp Dietrich for their part in it. They were bailed, and the trial itself did not commence until 6 May 1957. They were represented by the lawyer Alfred Seidl who had defended Rudolf Hess at the Nuremberg Trials. Lippert and Dietrich were charged with manslaughter, in Lippert's case for the death of Röhm. Lippert asserted that he had remained outside Röhm's cell, and only Theodor Eicke had gone in. On 10 May, the case was summed-up and the prosecutor demanded a two-year sentence for Lippert. On 14 May, the president of the Court found both Lippert and Dietrich guilty and sentenced both men to 18 months. He described Lippert as "filled with a dangerous and unrepentant fanaticism". Lippert died on 1 September 1969.

Summary of SS career
 Hauptwachtmeister der Landespolizei - 1920
 SS-Truppführer - 10 March 1931
 SS-Sturmführer - 15 November 1931
 SS-Sturmhauptführer - 5 August 1933
 SS-Sturmbannführer - 9 November 1933
 SS-Obersturmbannführer - 1934
 Oberleutnant der Reserve (Luftwaffe) - 1 December 1939
 SS-Obersturmbannführer der Reserve der Waffen-SS — 4 January 1940
 SS-Standartenführer der Waffen-SS - 20 April 1943

Notes

References 

SS-Standartenführer
1897 births
1969 deaths
People from Wunsiedel (district)
People from the Kingdom of Bavaria
Sachsenhausen concentration camp personnel
Nazi concentration camp commandants
Recipients of the Iron Cross (1914), 2nd class
Recipients of the Iron Cross (1939), 1st class
Recipients of the Military Merit Cross (Bavaria)
Nazis convicted of war crimes
German people convicted of manslaughter
Waffen-SS personnel